The president of Greece, officially the President of the Hellenic Republic, commonly referred to in Greek as the President of the Republic, is the head of state of Greece. The president is elected by the Hellenic Parliament; the role has been mainly ceremonial since the 1986 constitutional reform. The office was formally established by the Constitution of Greece in 1975, but has antecedents in the Second Hellenic Republic of 1924–1935 and the Greek junta in 1973–1974 which predated the transition to the current Third Hellenic Republic. The incumbent, since 13 March 2020, is Katerina Sakellaropoulou.

Powers

The president is the nominal commander-in-chief of the Greek Armed Forces and occupies the first place in the country's order of precedence. Although the Greek Constitution of 1974 vested the presidency with considerable powers on paper, in practice presidents took a largely ceremonial role; the prime minister of Greece is the active chief executive of the Greek government and the country's leading political figure. The president's role was formally brought into line with practice by the 1986 constitutional amendment, which reduced the official powers.

Election
According to Article 32 of the Greek Constitution, the president is elected for a five-year term by the Hellenic Parliament in a special session at least a month before the incumbent's term expires. Voting takes place in up to five ballots, separated by no more than five days.

The first and second ballots require a supermajority of 200 out of the 300-person body, dropping to 180 on the third. The fourth ballot requires a simple majority of 151 votes. The fifth and last ballot is then contested between the two candidates with the most votes and decided by a relative majority.

Oath of office
Before taking office, the president must recite an oath in front of the Parliament according to the Article 33, paragraph 2 of the Greek Constitution:

Official residence

The official residence of the president of Greece is the Presidential Mansion, formerly the New Royal Palace, in central Athens.

History

The current Third Hellenic Republic was established in 1974 during the period of metapolitefsi, after the end of the Greek junta which had controlled Greece since the coup d'état of 21 April 1967.

On 1 June 1973 the then leader of the military junta and regent for the exiled King Constantine II, Georgios Papadopoulos, abolished the Greek monarchy and proclaimed himself President of the Republic. A staged referendum on 29 July 1973 confirmed the regime change, and passed a new constitution which established a presidential republic. This attempt at controlled democratization was ended by Brigadier Dimitrios Ioannidis' overthrow of Papadopoulos on 25 November 1973. The republic and its symbols (but not the semi-presidential system) were formally maintained, but they were nothing more than a façade for the military regime. Lt. General Phaedon Gizikis was appointed President of the Republic, but power was in the hands of Ioannidis, who ruled behind the scenes.

After the fall of the junta and the return to civilian rule under Konstantinos Karamanlis in August 1974, the constitutional acts of the military regime were deemed invalid, and a new referendum was held on 8 December 1974, which confirmed the abolition of the monarchy. In the interim, Gizikis, remained in office as President. After the plebiscite, he was succeeded by the first elected president, Michail Stasinopoulos.

A new constitution, promulgated on 11 June 1975, declared Greece a presidential parliamentary democracy (or republic – the Greek δημοκρατία can be translated both ways). This constitution, revised in 1985, 2001, 2008 and 2019, is still in force today.

List of presidents of the Third Hellenic Republic

See also
List of heads of state of Greece

References

 
1974 establishments in Greece
Heads of state of Greece